Francisca Ordega (born 19 October 1993) is a Nigerian professional footballer who plays as a forward for CSKA Moscow in the Russian Women's Football Championship.

She represents Nigeria women's national football team (Super Falcons) at both the FIFA Women's World Cup and African Women's Championship.
She was also nominated for best female African footballer

Playing career

Club

Bayelsa Queens
Ordega began her career at the youth level for Bayelsa Queens, before being promoted to the professional side in 2008 where she played at Nigerian Women's Championship.

Rivers Angels
In 2011, she moved to Rivers Angels, one of the top clubs in Nigerian Women's Championship.

WFC Rossiyanka
In 2012, Ordega left Nigeria to sign with Russian champions Rossiyanka of the Russian Women's Football Championship. In November 2012, it was announced that Ordega and Rossiyanka mutually parted ways.

Piteå IF
In 2013, Ordega signed for Piteå IF in the Swedish Damallsvenskan. She scored her first goal on 26 May 2013 in a drawing effort against Vittsjö GIK. Between 2013 and 2015, she made 34 appearances and score 4 goals during her time in Sweden.

Washington Spirit
Ordega then moved across the North Atlantic and signed with Washington Spirit in the National Women's Soccer League. In her first season with the Spirit, Ordega scored three goals and made two assists. She returned in 2016 to score two goals during the regular season. The Nigerian's most memorable Spirit goal came in the NWSL Semifinal when she scored in extra time to send the Spirit to its first ever NWSL Championship.

In July 2017, Ordega suffered a knee injury that would limit her minutes for the remainder of the season. Despite the injury, she would still earn 14 appearances and scoring 4 goals.

Loan to Sydney FC
In December 2016, Sydney FC signed Ordega on loan from Washington for the remainder of the 2016–17 W-League season. The loan made her the first African to play in the Australian W-League. Ordega would make six appearances and score once helping Sydney earn 3rd place in the league.

Loan to Atlético Madrid
On 20 October 2017, Ordega joined Spanish club Atlético Madrid on a six-month loan from Washington. She made her debut on 1 November 2017 against Barcelona.

Move to Shanghai WFC
Ordega secured a one-year move to Shanghai WFC

Levante UD 
In April 2021, Ordega signed a deal with Levante UD running until 2023, in an attempt to boost their pursuit of qualifying for Champions League football for the first time in their history. Ordega made her debut on 22 May 2021 against Madrid CFF, coming an as a substitute in the 67th minute in a 3–2 victory.

International career
Ordega represented the Nigeria women's national football team in all levels. With the under 17, she played the 2010 FIFA U-17 Women's World Cup and with the under 20 at 2012 FIFA U-20 Women's World Cup. At senior level she played in the FIFA Women's World Cup tournaments of 2011, 2015 and 2019. At the latter she opened her World Cup account by scoring Nigeria's equalizing goal against Sweden on 8 June 2015 in Winnipeg, Manitoba, Canada. The pulsating match ended 3–3 in the opening game of Group D.

She was also part of Nigeria's squads at the African Women's Championship of 2010 and 2014, winning both tournaments.

In 2018, She was also a member of the Nigerian squad who won the 2018 Africa Women Cup of Nations in Ghana, A tournament where she had two goals and two assists and won the woman of the match award at the final game against South Africa. She was part of the Super Falcons squad that won the 2021 Turkish Women's Cup in Antalya, Turkey in February and thereby becoming the first African team to win the invitational tournament.

International goals
Scores and results list Nigeria's goal tally first

Honours

Club
 Rivers Angels
 Nigerian Women's Cup (1): 2012
 Atlético Madrid
 Primera División (1): 2017–18

International
 Nigeria
 African Women's Championship (4): 2010, 2014, 2016, 2018.

References

External links

 
 
  (2013)
  (2014)
 Profile at Washington Spirit
 

1993 births
Living people
People from Gboko
Nigerian women's footballers
Nigeria women's international footballers
Piteå IF (women) players
WFC Rossiyanka players
Washington Spirit players
Sydney FC (A-League Women) players
Atlético Madrid Femenino players
National Women's Soccer League players
A-League Women players
Women's association football forwards
2011 FIFA Women's World Cup players
2015 FIFA Women's World Cup players
Primera División (women) players
2019 FIFA Women's World Cup players
Damallsvenskan players
Nigerian expatriate women's footballers
Nigerian expatriate sportspeople in Russia
Expatriate women's footballers in Russia
Nigerian expatriate sportspeople in Sweden
Expatriate women's footballers in Sweden
Nigerian expatriate sportspeople in the United States
Expatriate women's soccer players in the United States
Nigerian expatriate sportspeople in Australia
Expatriate women's soccer players in Australia
Nigerian expatriate sportspeople in Spain
Expatriate women's footballers in Spain
Nigerian expatriate sportspeople in China
Expatriate women's footballers in China
Bayelsa Queens F.C. players
Rivers Angels F.C. players
21st-century Nigerian women